Societal attitudes towards same-sex relationships have varied over time and place, from expecting all males to engage in same-sex relationships, to casual integration, through acceptance, to seeing the practice as a minor sin, repressing it through law enforcement and judicial mechanisms, and to proscribing it under penalty of death. The following individuals received the death penalty for it.

Executed individuals
Mervyn Tuchet, 2nd Earl of Castlehaven (15931631), English nobleman tried and executed for committing sodomy with male servants and procuring the rape of his wife
 John Atherton (15981640), Bishop of Waterford and Lismore

Belgium

France

Germany

Italy

Malta

Netherlands

Poland

Portugal

Spain

Sweden

Switzerland

United Kingdom 

The details of the accusation are often not given in contemporary sources, with euphemisms such as "unnatural offence" used. However, such terms were also used to describe bestiality, non-consensual acts, and crimes against minors. Due to this, sources discussing and listing capital offences for homosexuality, including the table below, may inadvertently include men executed for such offences.

See also
 Capital punishment for homosexuality
 Criminalization of homosexuality in majority-Muslim countries
 Homosexuality in society
 List of executed people
 Violence against LGBT people

References

External links
 Claude Courouve, Procès de sodomie en France, (1307-1783). (In French)
 Stefano Bolognini & Giovanni Dall'Orto, List of executions for sodomy in Italy (1293-1782)'' (in Italian), "WikiPink".

 
 
Lists of executed people
Lists of LGBT-related people
People executed in Europe